Several naval ships of Germany were named Hessen after the state of Hesse, Germany:

  (battleship): 13,000 ton Braunschweig-class battleship, launched 1903
 : Hamburg-class (Type 101A) destroyer, scrapped 1991
 : Sachsen-class (Type 124) frigate, commissioned 2006

See also

German Navy ship names